The Secrets is a British drama television serial first broadcast on BBC One in 2014. The five-part series, made by Working Title Television, is directed by Dominic Savage. The writers are Elinor Cook, Nick Payne, Ben Ockrent and Sarah Solemani.

Each 30-minute episode begins by revealing a different secret and then exploring the repercussions on the characters involved.

Production
Filming began on 23 January 2014 in London. The producer is Guy Heeley and executive producers are Juliette Howell, Eric Fellner, Tim Bevan and Lucy Richer. The Secrets was commissioned by Danny Cohen and Ben Stephenson.

Episodes

References

External links
 
 

2010s British drama television series
2010s British television miniseries
2014 British television series debuts
2014 British television series endings
BBC television dramas
2010s British anthology television series
English-language television shows
Television shows set in the United Kingdom
Television series by Working Title Television